Dieter Koslar (6 May 1940 – 13 August 2002) was a German cyclist. He competed in the individual road race and the team time trial events at the 1968 Summer Olympics.

References

External links
 

1940 births
2002 deaths
German male cyclists
Olympic cyclists of West Germany
Cyclists at the 1968 Summer Olympics
Cyclists from Cologne
West German male cyclists